James Gerard Roche (born December 16, 1939) is an American politician. He served as the 20th Secretary of the Air Force, serving from January 20, 2001 to January 20, 2005.  Prior to serving as secretary, Roche served in the United States Navy for 23 years, and as an executive with Northrop Grumman.

Background
Roche was born in Brooklyn, New York. He served for 23 years in the United States Navy before retiring with the rank of Captain in 1983. As a naval officer, his assignments included Principal Deputy Director of the State Department's Policy Planning Staff; Senior Professional Staff Member of the Senate Select Committee on Intelligence; and assistant director for the Defense Department's Office of Net Assessment. He commanded USS Buchanan, a guided missile destroyer, and was awarded the Arleigh Burke Fleet Trophy for the Navy's most improved combat unit in the Pacific in 1974.

Prior to this appointment, Secretary Roche held several executive positions with Northrop Grumman Corp., including corporate vice president and president, Electronic Sensors and Systems Sector. Prior to joining Northrop Grumman in 1984, he was Democratic Staff Director of the U.S. Senate Armed Services Committee.

Secretary of the Air Force
Secretary Roche served as a member of the Secretary of Defense's Policy Board and was a member of the Council of Foreign Relations and the International Institute of Strategic Studies. Roche was awarded various campaign ribbons and military medals.

Ethics investigation
Roche was also cited for ethics violations regarding the Air Force's decision to lease KC-767 tanker aircraft.

In 2003, during the Air Force's deliberations concerning the replacement of KC-135 aircraft,  Ms. Robin Cleveland, Associate Director of National Security Programs, OMB, emailed Dr. Roche asking his assistance in gaining employment with Northrop Grumman Corporation (for which he had once been a senior executive) after she left her position with the government.   Dr. Roche did so and replied to Ms. Cleveland telling her so. This was a DoD ethics violation.  The investigation found that Roche had 'misused his office for public gain' and used government communications to do so, but made no recommendations for action.

Secretary of Defense Donald Rumsfeld saw no reason to pursue the matter.

Education

1960 Bachelor of Science degree in language, literature and philosophy, Illinois Institute of Technology, Chicago
1966 Master of Science degree with distinction in operations research, U.S. Naval Postgraduate School, Monterey, California
1972 Doctorate degree in business administration, Harvard Graduate School of Business Administration, Cambridge, Massachusetts
2002 Honorary Doctorate, Illinois Institute of Technology
2003 Honorary Doctorate, St. Thomas Aquinas College, Sparkill, New York

Career chronology
1960–1983, commissioned United States Navy officer, retiring with the rank of captain
1983–1984, Democratic Staff Director, Senate Armed Services Committee, Washington, D.C.
1984–1989, vice president and director, Analysis Center, Northrop Grumman Corp., Washington, D.C.
1989–1991, vice president and special assistant to the chairman, president and chief executive officer, Northrop Grumman Corp., Los Angeles, California
1991–1992, vice president of Advanced Development and Planning, Northrop Grumman Corp., Los Angeles, California
1992–1996, Chief Advanced Development, Planning, and Public Affairs Officer, Northrop Grumman Corp., Los Angeles, California
1996–2001, corporate vice president and president, Electronic Sensors & Systems Sector, Northrop Grumman Corp., Baltimore, Maryland
2001–2005, Secretary of the Air Force, Washington, D.C.

Awards and honors
  Defense Superior Service Medal
  Legion of Merit
  Navy Commendation Medal
  Navy Expeditionary Medal
  National Defense Service Medal
  Vietnam Service Medal
  United States Navy Distinguished Public Service Medal
2003 Department of the Army Distinguished Civilian Service Award
2003 Illinois Institute of Technology Professional Achievement Award
2003 U.S. Air Force Order of the Sword

References

External links

United States Government Departments and Offices
.

Living people
Illinois Institute of Technology alumni
Harvard Business School alumni
United States Navy officers
United States Secretaries of the Air Force
Recipients of the Legion of Merit
People from Brooklyn
People from Elgin, Illinois
Military personnel from New York City
1939 births
Recipients of the Order of the Sword (United States)
Recipients of the Defense Superior Service Medal
Recipients of the Navy Distinguished Public Service Award
George W. Bush administration personnel
George W. Bush administration controversies
The Washington Institute for Near East Policy